Littleton is a village in County Tipperary, Ireland. By-passed by the M8 in December 2008, Littleton lies at a crossroads on the R639 road. Its population was 394 at the 2016 census. It is in the barony of Eliogarty.

Littleton is closely associated with Bord na Móna, a semi-state company that harvests peat in the nearby complex of raised bogs. Littleton is also home to the 'Moycarkey Band', the Seán Treacy Pipe Band.

History
St. Ruadhan of Lorrha founded a monastery on a raised island in the middle of the bog at Littleton. The "island" is called Derrynaflan and it became famous when a ninth-century chalice, paten, stand and strainer were found there in 1980. They are now in the National Museum in Dublin.

Churches
A church of the Church of Ireland parish of Borrisleigh was built in 1786 with funding from the Board of First Fruits. In the 1960s, a church for the Catholic parish of Moycarkey was added.

See also
 List of towns and villages in the Republic of Ireland

References

Towns and villages in County Tipperary
Eliogarty